Xiong Zi may refer to:

King Wen of Chu (died 677 BC)
Xiong Zi (volleyball) (born 1976)